A by-election was held for the New South Wales Legislative Assembly electorate of The Lachlan on 10 January 1879 because James Watson was appointed Colonial Treasurer in the third Parkes ministry. Such ministerial by-elections were usually uncontested however on this occasion a poll was required in Canterbury (Sir Henry Parkes) and The Lachlan. Both were comfortably re-elected. The other 5 ministers were re-elected unopposed.

Dates

Result

James Watson was appointed Colonial Treasurer in the third Parkes ministry.

See also
Electoral results for the district of Lachlan
List of New South Wales state by-elections

References

1879 elections in Australia
New South Wales state by-elections
1870s in New South Wales